Lee Featherstone (born 20 July 1983) is an English professional footballer who plays as a midfielder for Woolley Moor United.

He previously played in the Football League for Scunthorpe United, as well as appearing at non-league level for Harrogate Town, Alfreton Town and Matlock Town.

References

English footballers
English Football League players
1983 births
Living people
Sheffield United F.C. players
Scunthorpe United F.C. players
Harrogate Town A.F.C. players
Alfreton Town F.C. players
Matlock Town F.C. players
Northern Premier League players
Association football midfielders